The 2013–14 Wyoming Cowboys basketball team represented the University of Wyoming during the 2013–2014 NCAA Division I men's basketball season. Their head coach was Larry Shyatt in his third year. They played their home games at the Arena-Auditorium in Laramie, Wyoming. The Cowboys were a member of the Mountain West Conference. They finished the season 18–15, 9–9 in Mountain West play to finish in a tie for fifth place. They lost in the quarterfinals of the Mountain West Conference tournament to UNLV. They were invited to the College Basketball Invitational where they lost in the first round to Texas A&M.

Departures

Recruiting

Roster

Statistics

Schedule and results

|-
!colspan=9 style="background:#492f24; color:#ffc425;"| Exhibition

|-
!colspan=9 style="background:#492f24; color:#ffc425;"| Regular season

|-
!colspan=9 style="background:#492f24; color:#ffc425;"| Mountain West regular season

|-
!colspan=9 style="background:#492f24; color:#ffc425;"| Mountain West tournament

|-
!colspan=9 style="background:#492f24; color:#ffc425;"| CBI

See also
2013–14 Wyoming Cowgirls basketball team

References

Wyoming Cowboys basketball seasons
Wyoming
Wyoming
Wyoming Cowboys bask
Wyoming Cowboys bask